Gerhard Wucherer (born 11 February 1948 in Kempten im Allgäu, Bavaria)  is a German former athlete who competed mainly in the 100 metres.

He competed for West Germany in the 1972 Summer Olympics held in Munich, Germany in the 4 x 100 metre relay where he won the bronze medal with his team mates Jobst Hirscht, Karlheinz Klotz and Klaus Ehl.

References

External links

1948 births
Living people
People from Kempten im Allgäu
Sportspeople from Swabia (Bavaria)
West German male sprinters
Athletes (track and field) at the 1968 Summer Olympics
Athletes (track and field) at the 1972 Summer Olympics
Olympic athletes of West Germany
Olympic bronze medalists for West Germany
European Athletics Championships medalists
Medalists at the 1972 Summer Olympics
Olympic bronze medalists in athletics (track and field)